Sutton is an electoral ward in the district of Bassetlaw. The ward elects one councillor to Bassetlaw District Council using the first past the post electoral system for a four-year term in office. The number of registered voters in the ward is 1,670 as of 2019.

It consists of the villages of Babworth, Barnby Moor, Sutton cum Lound and Lound.

The ward was created in 2002 following a review of electoral boundaries in Bassetlaw by the Boundary Committee for England.

Councillors

The ward elects one councillor every four years. Prior to 2015, Bassetlaw District Council was elected by thirds with elections taking place every year except the year in which elections to Nottinghamshire County Council took place.

Elections

2022 by-election
A by-election was held on 24 November 2022 due to the resignation of Denise Depledge (Conservative)

2021 by-election
A by-election was held on 6 May 2021 due to the resignation of Rob Boeuf (Independent).

2019

2015

2012

2008

2004

2003 by-election
A by-election was held on 18 September 2003.

2002

References

Wards of Nottinghamshire